Brian Johnson (born March 5, 1980, in Iowa, Louisiana) is an American long jumper.

Johnson is a 2003 NCAA indoor champion, a 2006 U.S. outdoor long jump champion, and a two-time U.S. indoor champion (2005 and 2006). He posted a personal best of 8.33 metres by placing second in the men's long jump at an international meet in Fort-de-France, Martinique. Johnson also won a silver medal for his category at the 2007 IAAF World Athletics Final in Stuttgart, Germany, with a best jump of 8.16 metres.

Johnson earned a spot on the U.S. team for the 2008 Summer Olympics in Beijing, by placing second at the U.S. Olympic Trials in Eugene, Oregon, with a best jump of 8.30 metres (27–2.75 ft). He competed as a member of U.S. track and field team in the men's long jump, along with his teammates Miguel Pate and Trevell Quinley. Johnson performed the best jump at 7.79 metres from his second attempt, but fell short in his bid for the final, as he placed twenty-second overall in the qualifying rounds.

Johnson currently resides in Baton Rouge, Louisiana, where he works as an assistant track and field coach at Southern University.

References

External links
 
 
 NBC Olympics Profile

1980 births
Living people
American male long jumpers
African-American male track and field athletes
Olympic track and field athletes of the United States
Athletes (track and field) at the 2008 Summer Olympics
Sportspeople from Baton Rouge, Louisiana
People from Iowa, Louisiana
21st-century African-American sportspeople
20th-century African-American people